Brooks Steam Motors, Ltd. was a Canadian manufacturer of steam cars established in March 1923. Its cars more closely resembled the Stanley Steamers in terms of engineering rather than the more sophisticated Doble steam cars. The company was formed from the defunct Detroit Steam Motors Corporation.

History
The company and its car were named for an American financier, Oland J. Brooks, who had relocated from Buffalo, New York, to Toronto in 1920. His main area of business was finance and second mortgages, carried on by the Banking Service Corporation, Ltd.

In September 1923 a prototype car was shown at the Toronto Exhibition and the following month an agreement was reached with the city of Stratford, Ontario to purchase a former threshing machine factory for $55,000. At the same time an executive office was set up in suites 1305–7 of the Canadian Pacific Railway Building in Toronto.

Planned models
Brooks planned to manufacture three lines of cars, Models 1,2 and 3.

The smallest, the Model 1, had a  wheelbase and an  boiler, and prices were to begin at $1,000. Variants were planned, including a four-passenger touring car and a two-passenger roadster, plus closed-body styles comprising a coupe, a four-passenger brougham and a five-passenger sedan. The specifications closely matched the smallest model of the defunct Trask-Detroit steam car.

The Model 2 had a longer  wheelbase and a  boiler. The open models were a four-passenger sports car and a five-passenger touring car. Three closed-body models were proposed: a four-passenger brougham, a five-passenger sedan and a town car. The wheels were to be Budd-Michelin steel disc type. Again, the specifications bore a close resemblance to the Trask-Detroit, in this case the larger prototype.

The Model 3 was to use a  wheelbase as per the Model 2, but with a larger  boiler. The open body models were also to be as per the Model 2, with a seven-passenger closed-body touring car. Again, all cars were to be fitted with Budd-Michelin steel disc wheels. The color choices were limited and identical to the Model 2: open-body cars could be blue (one shade being named "Brooks Blue") or maroon, while closed-body cars were available in another two shades of blue. Other colours could be supplied but would require six weeks' notice.

In the event only a single Brooks model was produced, which could best be described as a combination of the Model 2's engine and the Model 3's weight. One touring car was a prototype (and appeared to have been a renamed Trask-Detroit), while the rest were five-passenger sedans. The standard colour was black.

Technology
Brooks' first chief engineer was steam expert Eric Delling (who also formed a car company). He styled the Brooks' power plant after the Stanley two-cylinder engine, rather than the more sophisticated (and costly to produce) Doble. The Brooks was reported as being more robust than the Stanley steam cars, its boiler was of conventional fully welded steel construction with a water leg, but the boiler was undersized for the car's mass, making too little steam to propel the  car much above 35 - .

The Brooks cars were distinguished by their fabric bodies constructed from Meritas brand cloth by the American Auto Trimming Company in Walkerville, Ontario, Meritas being a composite material formed from wire netting, two layers of wadding, canvas and an outer layer of two-ply artificial leather. There were no metal body panels. The fabric body's relatively light weight improved the cars' power-to-weight ratio and lowered the centre of gravity which improved stability. Brooks styled its fabric bodies as though they were metal, using a conventional three-window sedan shape with a certain quantity of chromed fittings.

The Brooks was an expensive car, with the sedan listed at $3,885 at a time when entry-level Pierce-Arrows could be purchased in Canada for $3,800. Prices were dropped to $2,885 in 1927.

Despite expectations of employing hundreds, by 1925 the factory had a mere 90 employees, with another 20 or so at service stations and showrooms in Montreal and Toronto. Most of the work was reported to consist of driving the cars throughout Canada, some accompanied by Oland J. Brooks, to promote the company. Branches were announced in various cities but may have only existed as agencies.

The company extolled the suitability of the Brooks car for women drivers, with one brochure stating:
"Women motorists, who invariably grasp the wheel as rigidly as the arm of a dentist's chair, now relax and take it easy when they drive a Brooks steamer."

An English representative was appointed, and plans made to export the cars to Britain. One of the cars was shown at the October 1924 London automobile show, "Olympia", but the British price was £996, at a time when an Itala sedan cost £800 and a six-cylinder Packard £775.

Brooks steam buses
In late 1926, it was announced that Brooks had purchased a factory in Buffalo, New York, to build steam buses. It was also announced that the Stratford factory would be relocated to a Canadian site closer to Buffalo and an American holding company, Brooks Steam Motors Inc. was established.

The first Brooks bus incorporated standard steam car technology, using a V8 poppet-valve engine; because both strokes in a steam engine are power strokes, the eight-cylinder engine was said to be the equivalent of a gasoline V16.

In the summer of 1927, a prototype was constructed with a 29-passenger parlour car-style aluminum body by the Buffalo Body Company. At the time, the main bus show in the United States was held at the annual convention of the trolley car association, the American Electric Railway Association (AERA) and the bus was displayed at the October 1927 event in Cleveland, Ohio. It was the first time a steam-driven vehicle had been shown there, but no orders were taken; it was displayed purely as an experimental vehicle.

In late 1927, following a lack of progress in production, the stockholders took charge of the company and forced Oland Brooks out. A new engineer was appointed, A. Clarkson, who had been chief engineer of the London Omnibus Company in England and whose father had been a pioneer in steam buses.

In 1928, Brooks Steam Motors, Inc. filed a "surrender of authority" in Albany, New York, on February 10.

A second V8 steam bus was introduced in July 1929. Manufactured in Buffalo, it offered a new generation of steam technology powering the previous V8 engine. The pilot light and boiler were eliminated and replaced with a steam generator (in effect, a boiler in the form of square section water tube coils). The fire was spark-controlled, as per the Doble steam cars, allowing the vehicle to get underway in 20 seconds. This meant that there was no longer a danger of a serious explosion from vaporized fuel. One of the novel features of the engine was that once operational power was reached - 750 psi  - the engine fire was cut off, allowing the bus to operate without its engine running.

This last bus was a city bus, with places for 39 sitting passengers and about the same number of standing ones.

The end of Brooks
The New York Times reported the display of the bus on October 14, 1929, two weeks before the Stock Market Crash which heralded the Great Depression.

The Canadian company had entered a legal limbo as stockholders sought liquidation. On December 15 & 16, 1931, an unreserved auction sale was held at the Stratford factory and the entire contents of the plant were sold. Remaining cars were sold for prices ranging from $150 to $400. Total production of the Brooks Steam Car is estimated at 180 cars.

It is unclear exactly how the Brooks empire unraveled, but remaining records suggest that the Depression thwarted efforts to keep going. Brooks Steam Motors, Inc. continued to be listed in the Buffalo City Directory through 1932, and in 1931 the company was listed as also making electric refrigerators in addition to steam buses. By 1933, the factory was listed as the home of Cataract-Sharpe, a glassware manufacturer, and Brooks Steam Motors Inc. was dissolved by the New York State Division of Corporations on December 15, 1936.

The Brooks factory in Stratford reverted to the city and was used for storage until World War II, when an upholstery company bought it. It was eventually demolished in 2001.

See also
 Detroit Steam Motors Corporation
 Steam bus
 Steam car
 Steam engine
 Timeline of steam power

References

External links
 "Brooks Steam Motors": article at The Steam Car Club of Great Britain website

Steam cars
Steam buses
Defunct motor vehicle manufacturers of Canada
History of manufacturing in Ontario